Meriden, An Anglican School for Girls is an independent Anglican single-sex early learning, primary, and secondary day school for girls, located in Strathfield, an inner-western suburb of Sydney, New South Wales, Australia.

Founded in 1897 by Jane Monckton, the school has a non-selective enrolment policy and currently caters for approximately 1650 students from early learning, through Year K to Year 12.

Meriden is affiliated with the Association of Heads of Independent Girls' Schools (AHIGS), the Alliance of Girls' Schools Australasia, the Junior School Heads Association of Australia (JSHAA), and the Association of Heads of Independent Schools of Australia (AHISA).

History

Administratively operating as an Australian company limited by guarantee since 17 March 1997, Meriden was founded by Jane (Jeannie) Monckton in 1897, at Agnes Street, Strathfield. Monckton had decided to home school her two sons due to a lack of suitable educational facilities for boys in the Strathfield area. Friends and neighbours clamoured to have their children join the two boys under her instruction, and so it was decided to establish Meriden, a school with approximately 19 students and two staff to assist. Boarding facilities were available and fees for tuition were from 1½ guineas ($3.15) to 2 guineas per quarter for the regular curriculum, which included English, French, Latin, Mathematics, Australian History, Music, Needlework and Dancing.
In 1907, Meriden moved to Woodward Avenue, where it was sold to Bertha Turner in 1908. Turner continued at Woodward Ave until larger premises could be found near Santa Sabina College on the Boulevarde, moving again soon after to its current location in the original Redmire Estate, on Redmyre Road. The school expanded in 1914 with the purchase two properties, The Briars, located adjacent to Meriden, and the original site at Redmyre Road.

In 1918, following the 1916 changes to Department of Education requirements, Turner approached the Sydney Church of England Girls' Grammar School (SCEGGS) in Darlinghurst with the concept of amalgamation. Further negotiations were however prevented due to financial commitments, and the SCEGGS Council suggested that a group of local church people might be interested. The first school uniform and the school logo were introduced in 1921, and in 1922 the Meriden flag was presented by the Old Girls' Union.

As Turner's health deteriorated, there was a suspicion that the school might close, and subsequently, a group of local people met to discuss the future of Meriden. It was agreed that a Council should manage the school, and debentures were sold in order to obtain the necessary finance. The original home, Wariora, which was owned by Turner, was not included in this transfer but remained her property. On her death, Wariora was transferred to her brother, who sold it on to the gardener and his wife, who in turn ran it as a boarding house. Wariora was eventually purchased by Meriden and was extended to include the school tuck shop. This building has since been demolished.

After Turner's death, Grace Ovary was appointed by the Council as the new Headmistress. In 1927, sports practice was carried out at the cow pastures in the grounds of a ruined mansion named Milroy in Broughton Road, Strathfield. The end of this decade saw a growing and profitable school.

In 1936, extensive additions were made to the school with the erection of Wallis Hall, seating 450 people. The new building, designed by Thomas Pollard Sampson, encased the existing residence, The Briars, that had become the centre of the school with a new red brick facade along Redmyre Road. The additions included an octagonal chapel forming an apsidal end to the main building with quatrefoil stained glass windows. A library, dormitories, bathrooms and classrooms were part of the development. This building, with further additions, is still the main wing of the school.

In 1961, a grand face brick Edwardian style  mansion, Selbourne facing Redmyre Road, became part of the extended school campus. It housed domestic staff for the boarding house students until it was demolished in 1978 for sports grounds. Originally known by different spelling, Selborne, the house was the family home of George A. Wilson, chairman of the Public Service Board of NSW until the death of his wife Philippa Marion Wilson in 1900. Selbourne became the home of the Walsord family in the first two decades of the 1900s and became the Earwaker family home in the 1927.

According to the Australian Securities and Investment Commission, Meriden School was formally registered on 6 March 1929.

In 1942, Meriden temporarily became the home of two schools as the Presbyterian Ladies' College (PLC), from the nearby suburb of Croydon, was occupied by the Royal Australian Air Force for the purpose of establishing a top secret Radar Unit. Meriden offered to accommodate the PLC boarders and the school's singing, domestic science, and physical education classes. In spite of the apparent happy relationship between the two schools, the PLC Principal, Dr Helen Wilkie, recommended that further integration between the two schools should not proceed, and thus at the end of 1942, Meriden indicated that it could no longer house the PLC boarders.

In 1957, Meriden purchased Wadham Preparatory School an independent day, co-educational, preparatory school located at 9–11 Wallis Avenue, Strathfield. The school had been established in 1943 by Kathleen Wyndham. The site was used as a sub-primary campus principally for girls, but also for nursery and kindergarten boys. In 1967 Meriden closed the Wadham campus having purchased land for its entire junior school in Redmyre Road, Strathfield. After its closure, the building was demolished and two large 1970s style face-brick houses now stand in its place.

In 1979, as with numerous other schools at the time, Meriden closed its boarding facility due to a steady decline in enrolments.

In 1997, Meriden became an Australia public company with its own board of directors. Although not under the formal organisational structure of the Anglican Church, Meriden emphasises an Anglican ethos. Meriden has been granted exemption from using the designator "Limited" (Ref: Australian Securities and Investment Commission, Document 005320905).

In 2015, a major construction project commenced at Meriden, involving an expansion for enlarged school grounds, the renovation of the school's Turner House wing, the construction of a new two-level sport centre with rooftop courts, and the renovation of the school's Wallis building for an improved library, hall and Year 12 common room.

Principals

School crest
Meriden's crest was designed by the school's art teacher, Mr Albert Collins, in 1921. The crest features Meriden's motto of Semper fidelis (translated from Latin as "always faithful"), together with a representation of the lilies of Parnassus. In ancient Greece, Mount Parnassus was regarded as the mountain sacred to the muses and the centre of the earth. The muses were said to preside over the realm of learning, with each having a special province, such as poetry, science or history.

Activities

Cocurricular Activities
Meriden offers an extensive program of extracurricular activities, including:
 Duke of Edinburgh's Award
 Da Vinci Decathlon
 Tournament of Minds
 Archdale Debating
 Festival of Speech
 Mock Trial
 Choir
 Intermediate and Senior Singers
 Orchestra (Symphony, String, Chamber, Sinfonia)
 Concert Band
 Chapel Band
 Jazz Band
 Chess 
 Interact
 Green Team
 Science Club
 STEM Club
 Art Club

Sports
Meriden participates in IGSA (Independent Girls Schools' Association) where sport teams representing Meriden are formed and play against other private girls schools in Sydney. There is also a Personal Development, Health and Physical Education program which is compulsory for all girls in years 7–10, with 3 PDHPE lessons per fortnight(2 being a practical and 1 learning about health).

House system
Meriden School's original house system was established in 1931 by the headmistress at the time, Miss Overy, who named the houses after English counties. The original four houses were:
Warwick (Yellow)
Cumberland (Blue)
Kent (Green)
Sussex (Red)
In 2014, two more houses were introduced to meet the need for improved house-based pastoral care. In line with tradition, the new houses were named after English counties that are famous for their universities.
The two new houses were:
Oxford (Orange)
Durham (Purple)
Each year, students in each house are to vote for their new Year 11 house leaders – the House Captain who is supported by the Service Officer, Arts Officer and Sports Officer.  Through the house system, students participate in inter-house competitions in order to gain points for their house. Competitions include the Athletics Carnival, Swimming Carnival, House Choral Competition, House Arts Competition, Inter-house Sport Competition and Inter-house Maths Competition. The house with the most points at the end of the school year is awarded the Wallis Cup.

Associated schools 
Meriden's brother school is Trinity Grammar School at Summer Hill, an Anglican day and boarding school for boys.

Old Girls

Education and community
 Helen Halse Rogers OBE – social worker and chair of Historic Houses Trust of New South Wales
 Silma Ihram – education pioneer
 Robin Morrow  – lecturer, critic and editor in children's literature and president of the Australian section of the International Board on Books for Young People IBBY Australia.
 Sally Ruston AM – Head of Junior School Abbotsleigh
 Rev Catherine Wynn Jones – Royal Australian Navy Chaplain and former Vice Chairman of Meriden School Council

Entertainment, media and the arts
 Sally Ayre-Smith - Producer of SeaChange
 Harriet Ayre-Smith – Actress and former Chanel publicist
 Pamela Clark – cooking editor, editorial and food director of the Australian Women's Weekly
 Kellie Crawford – singer and actress, Teen Queens and Hi-5
 Patti Crocker - actress and author of Radio Days
 Barbara Davidson – printmaker who specialises in etching
 Desmonde Downing — stage designer
 Helen Kenny — literary editor of the Sydney Morning Herald
 Sarah Monahan – actress on Hey Dad..!
 Natalie Tran – Vlogger, actress, comedian and writer, known by the handle communitychannel
 Nadia Wheatley – writer, journalist

Law
 Elizabeth Broderick  – Lawyer and former Sex Discrimination Commissioner
 Jennifer Blackman   – Retired Judge of the District Court of New South Wales
 Shirley Chowdhary – Lawyer and CEO of the GO Foundation

Medicine
 Professor Elizabeth McCusker OAM – neurologist in the field of Huntington’s disease

Government and politics
 Elaine Cassidy – former mayor
 Betty Davy  – teacher and activist
 Eve Dutton  – former mayor
 Anne Aly — Labor Party member of the Australian House of Representatives
 Catherine West — Labour Party member of the House of Commons of the United Kingdom
 Joan, Lady Cutler (the second wife of Sir Roden Cutler) also attended St Catherine's School, Waverley

See also 

 List of non-government schools in New South Wales
 Wadham Preparatory School

References

Further reading
 Cook, A. 1997. Visions of Parnassus: Meriden's first 100 years. Meriden Council, Meriden School.

External links 
 Meriden School website

Girls' schools in New South Wales
Educational institutions established in 1897
Association of Heads of Independent Girls' Schools
Junior School Heads Association of Australia Member Schools
Anglican secondary schools in Sydney
Anglican primary schools in Sydney
1897 establishments in Australia
Strathfield, New South Wales
Alliance of Girls' Schools Australasia